John Wayne Ennis (born October 17, 1979) is an American former professional baseball right-handed relief pitcher. Ennis made his Major League Baseball (MLB) debut on April 10, with the Atlanta Braves.

Ennis pitched 4 innings in his first MLB game; however, that one appearance was his only appearance for the Braves. Ennis made his Philadelphia Phillies debut on August 26, pitching three innings and getting his first career save. He was designated for assignment by the Phillies on February 26, . On August 6, 2008, Ennis' contract was sold to the Samsung Lions of the Korea Baseball Organization (KBO), where he pitched for the rest of the season.

On February 25, Ennis signed with the Lancaster Barnstormers of the independent Atlantic League, but on March 3, signed a minor league contract with the Philadelphia Phillies.

After pitching in the first game of the season, Ennis suffered an injury to his elbow and was told he needed Tommy John surgery which would end his season. The Phillies released him on November 10, 2009.

References

External links

Korea Baseball Organization
John Ennis at Pura Pelota (Venezuelan Professional Baseball League)

1979 births
Living people
American expatriate baseball players in Canada
American expatriate baseball players in South Korea
Atlanta Braves players
Baseball players from Colorado
Caribes de Anzoátegui players
Danville Braves players
Detroit Tigers players
Erie SeaWolves players
Greenville Braves players
Gulf Coast Braves players
Indios de Mayagüez players
KBO League pitchers
Lehigh Valley IronPigs players
Leones del Caracas players
American expatriate baseball players in Venezuela
Macon Braves players
Major League Baseball pitchers
Myrtle Beach Pelicans players
Ottawa Lynx players
People from Montrose, Colorado
Philadelphia Phillies players
Reading Phillies players
Richmond Braves players
Samsung Lions players
Tiburones de La Guaira players
Toledo Mud Hens players